The 1965–66 Liga Alef season saw Maccabi Haifa (champions of the North Division) and SK Nes Tziona (champions of the South Division) win the title and promotion to Liga Leumit.

North Division

South Division

References
North: Veterans will dominate Maariv, 9.9.66, Historical Jewish Press 
South: Equalized struggle at the top Maariv, 9.9.66, Historical Jewish Press 
Previous seasons The Israel Football Association 

Liga Alef seasons
Israel
2